The Table Tennis at the 1987 Southeast Asian Games was held between 10 September to 16 September at Senayan Sports Complex.

Medal summary

Medal table

References
 http://eresources.nlb.gov.sg/newspapers/Digitised/Article/straitstimes19870912-1.2.44.15.15
 http://eresources.nlb.gov.sg/newspapers/Digitised/Article/straitstimes19870914-1.2.43.35
 http://eresources.nlb.gov.sg/newspapers/Digitised/Article/straitstimes19870917-1.2.57.22.4

1987
Southeast Asian Games
Table tennis competitions in Indonesia